The following are the telephone numbers in Lesotho. Lesotho was allocated the country code +266 by the International Telecommunication Union in the late 1960s.
Previously, Lesotho had area codes, which were integrated into the South African telephone numbering plan, and calls could be made from South Africa using the regional code 050. For example, to call a number in Maseru, subscribers would dial 0501, while to call a number in Mazenod, they would dial 05022. From the rest of the world, subscribers would dial +266 1.

Area codes
 22,28 Maseru Reserved for fixed
 56,57,58,59,63, Reserved for cellular use
 27,52 Reserved for fixed mobile (corporated direct)
 6x Reserved for cellular use

Errata
There had been some interest in using part of this country's numbering scheme to run international SMS promotions or competitions, as when +CNN is spelt out on an E.161 standard telephone keypad, it translates to +266. CNN's degree of interest in the idea was unknown at the time.

References

External links
ITU allocations list

Lesotho
Lesotho communications-related lists
Telecommunications in Lesotho